The 2003 FIFA Women's World Cup qualification process decided the 15 teams which played at the 2003 FIFA Women's World Cup, with the host China initially qualified automatically as the host nation.
The qualification process for the 2003 FIFA Women's World Cup saw 99 teams from the six FIFA confederations compete for the 16 places in the tournament's finals. The places were divided as follows:
Africa - represented by the CAF: 2 berths
Asia - AFC: 3.5 
Europe - UEFA: 5
North, Central America & the Caribbean - CONCACAF: 2.5
Oceania - OFC: 1
South America - CONMEBOL: 2

Qualified teams

Confederation qualification

AFC

Like the previous edition, the AFC Women's Championship served as the tournament qualification for AFC members. Fourteens competed in the competition which included the World Cup hosts in China. After the group stage which eliminated ten teams from qualifying, the semi-finals saw the first team in North Korea as they defeated Japan 3-0. After China won the second semi, the third-place play-off would see South Korea qualify with a 1-0 victory over Japan which meant Japan had to qualify via play-off against the third place team from CONCACAF (Mexico).

Final tournament
Group A

Group B

Group C

Knockout stage (top two teams qualify for World Cup)

CAF

Like the previous edition, the Africa Women's Championship served as the tournament qualification for CAF members.
Qualifying stage: Qualifying for the 2002 edition took place between 10 August to 13 October 2002. 21 teams entered the qualification with seven teams getting the bye into the second-round. Qualification ties were played on a home-and-away two-legged basis. The seven winners of the second round qualified for the final tournament to join the hosts Nigeria who qualified automatically. 
Final tournament: Eight teams played in the 2002 African Women's Championship, which was held from 7 to 20 December 2002 in Nigeria. They were drawn into two groups of four teams. The top two teams of each group advanced to the knockout stage, where the winners of the semi-finals and the third place play-off qualified for the World Cup.

Qualifying stage

The seven winners of the second qualifying round advanced to the final tournament: Angola, Cameroon, Ethiopia, Ghana, Mali,  South Africa, and Zimbabwe.

Final tournament
Group A

Group B

Knockout stage (top two teams qualify for World Cup)

Europe (UEFA)

Qualified:  --  --  --  -- 

The 16 teams belonging to Class A of European women's football were drawn into four groups, from which the group winners qualify for the World Cup. The four runners-up were played in playoff-matches for the 5th berth.

North, Central America & the Caribbean (CONCACAF)

Qualified:  -- 

The 2002 CONCACAF Women's Gold Cup second-placed Canada qualified for the 2003 FIFA Women's World Cup. The winner USA qualified as host. The third-placed Mexico played against Japan in two play-off matches for qualification.

Oceania (OFC)

Qualified: 

The 2003 OFC Women's Championship determined the OFC's one qualifier for the 2003 FIFA Women's World Cup — the winner Australia.

South America (CONMEBOL)

Qualified:  -- 

The fourth edition of the Sudamericano Femenino (Women's South American Championship) in 2003 determined the CONMEBOL's qualifiers Brazil and Argentina.

CONCACAF–AFC play-off

References

External links
Tables & results at RSSSF.com

 
FIFA Women's World Cup qualification